Pir Baksh Junejo (born 14 February 1956) is a Pakistani politician who had been a member of the National Assembly of Pakistan, from June 2013 to May 2018.

Early life
He was born on 14 February 1956.

Political career

He ran for the seat of the National Assembly of Pakistan as an independent candidate from Constituency NA-234 (Sanghar-I), Constituency NA-235 ( Sanghar-cum-Mirpurkhas-cum-Umerkot) and Constituency NA-236 (Sanghar-II) in 2008 Pakistani general election but was unsuccessful. He received 15 votes from Constituency NA-234 (Sanghar-I) and lost the seat to Muhammad Jadam Mangrio, He received 16 votes from Constituency NA-235 ( Sanghar-cum-Mirpurkhas-cum-Umerkot) and lost the seat to Ghulam Dastgir Rajar, a candidate of Pakistan Muslim League (F) (PML-F). He received 5 votes from Constituency NA-236 (Sanghar-II) and lost the seat to Roshan Din Junejo. In the same election, he ran for the seat of the Provincial Assembly of Sindh from Constituency PS-81 (Sanghar-IV) as an independent candidate but was unsuccessful. He received 20 votes and lost the seat to Jam Madad Ali Khan.

He was elected to the National Assembly as a candidate of PML-F from Constituency NA-234 (Sanghar-I) in 2013 Pakistani general election. He received 90,787 votes and defeated Fida Hussain Dero, a candidate of Pakistan Peoples Party (PPP).

References

Living people
Sindhi people
Pakistani MNAs 2013–2018
People from Sindh
1956 births